Jerome Ch'en  (October 2, 1919 – June 17, 2019) was a Chinese-Canadian historian.

Early life and education
Ch'en was born as Ch'en Chih-jang in Chengdu, Sichuan, Republic of China in October 1919. He was educated at Tianjin Nankai University, National Southwestern Associated University in Kunming during the Anti-Japanese War and at the London School of Economics (LSE), which he attended funded by a Boxer Indemnity Scholarship and where he studied under Friedrich Hayek.

Academic career
In the 1950s, Ch'en worked for the Chinese Service of the BBC. Before emigrating to Canada he was a Reader in history at the University of Leeds for a number of years. He was Professor of Chinese History at York University in Toronto, Canada from 1971 to 1987. He was the director of the University of Toronto/York University Joint Centre of Asia Pacific Studies (JCAPS) from 1983 to 1985.

Honours
Ch'en was made a Fellow of the Royal Society of Canada in 1981. In 1984, he was named Distinguished Research Professor at York.

Death
Ch'en died in St. Catharines, Ontario, Canada in June 2019 at the age of 99.

Selected publications
 Yuan Shih-ka̕i, 1859-1916: Brutus Assumes the Purple (George Allen & Unwin, 1961).
The Highlanders of Central China: a History 1895 – 1937
Mao and the Chinese Revolution
The Military-Gentry coalition—the Warlords Period in Modern Chinese History
China and the West: Society and Culture 1815 – 1937 (Hutchinson, 1979)

Ch'en also edited:
Great Lives Observed: Mao

Some of his works have been translated into Chinese or Japanese.

References

Further reading
 Lary, Diana.   "Jerome Ch’en obituary: Historian of modern China, cut off from his roots, who rued the rise of the military and the Communist conquest" The Guardian 18 July 2019. online

External links
Jerome Ch'en archives at the Clara Thomas Archives and Special Collections, York University Libraries, Toronto, Ontario
 Jerome Ch'en Resource Centre for East Asian Studies

1919 births
2019 deaths
20th-century Canadian historians
21st-century Canadian historians
Academics of the University of Leeds
Alumni of the London School of Economics
Boxer Indemnity Scholarship recipients
Canadian male non-fiction writers
Canadian sinologists
Chinese emigrants to Canada
Chinese expatriates in the United Kingdom
Chinese sinologists
BBC people
Educators from Sichuan
Fellows of the Royal Society of Canada
Historians from Sichuan
Modern Chinese historians
Nankai University alumni
National Southwestern Associated University alumni
Writers from Chengdu
Academic staff of York University